Aaron Island is an island in the City and Borough of Juneau, Alaska, United States. It was named by Lester A. Beardslee in 1880.

References

Islands of the Alexander Archipelago
Islands of Juneau, Alaska
Islands of Alaska